Clinton County is a county located in the U.S. state of Ohio. As of the 2020 census, the population was 42,018. Its county seat and largest city is Wilmington. The county is named for former U.S. Vice President George Clinton. Clinton County comprises the Wilmington, Ohio Micropolitan Statistical Area, which is also included in the Cincinnati-Wilmington-Maysville, OH-KY-IN Combined Statistical Area.

History
Clinton County was formed on February 19, 1810, from sections of Highland County and Warren County, with the law creating the county taking effect on March 1 of that year. It was named after George Clinton, a soldier, politician, Governor of New York, and Vice President of the United States.

Geography

The entire county lies within the Little Miami River watershed, with the exception of extreme eastern areas, which are within the Scioto River watershed. Clinton County lies within the till plains physiographic region, and is somewhat flat or gently rolling. The northern two thirds of the county were covered with an ice sheet during the Wisconsinan Stage, while the southern third was covered by ice sheets during the much older Illinoian Stage. Because of such a history with ice, glacial features are readily found on the landscape, such as moraines and kames.

The climate of Clinton County can be classified as humid continental. It is one of the coolest and wettest counties in southern Ohio, although differences between it and other southern Ohio counties are usually very slight. Clinton County averages  of precipitation per year, including  of snow (Note: one inch of snow does not equal one inch of precipitation). Average July high temperatures reach the mid and upper 80s F although temperatures above 90 F are common, while lows are typically in the 60s F. January high temperatures typically reach the low and mid 30s F, while lows generally bottom out in the 10s F, although lows in the single digits and even below  are common.

Adjacent counties
Greene County (north)
Fayette County (northeast)
Highland County (southeast)
Brown County (south)
Clermont County (southwest)
Warren County (west)

Demographics

2010 census
As of the 2010 United States Census, there were 42,040 people, 16,210 households, and 11,364 families living in the county. The racial makeup of the county was 94.7% white, 2.2% black or African American, 0.5% Asian, 0.2% American Indian, 0.5% from other races, and 1.9% from two or more races. Those of Hispanic or Latino origin made up 1.3% of the population. In terms of ancestry, 26.4% were German, 15.4% were Irish, 12.0% were American, and 11.9% were English.

Of the 16,210 households, 33.5% had children under the age of 18 living with them, 52.9% were married couples living together, 11.9% had a female householder with no husband present, 29.9% were non-families, and 25.1% of all households were made up of individuals. The average household size was 2.52 and the average family size was 2.99. The median age was 38.7 years.

The median income for a household in the county was $46,261 and the median income for a family was $56,208. Males had a median income of $42,134 versus $31,380 for females. The per capita income for the county was $22,163. About 11.2% of families and 14.0% of the population were below the poverty line, including 18.6% of those under age 18 and 7.9% of those age 65 or over.

2000 census
As of the census of 2000, there were 40,543 people, 15,416 households, and 11,068 families living in the county. The population density was 99 people per square mile (38/km2). There were 16,577 housing units at an average density of 40 per square mile (16/km2). The racial makeup of the county was 95.99% White, 2.19% Black or African American, 0.26% Native American, 0.38% Asian, 0.20% from other races, and 0.97% from two or more races. 0.66% of the population were Hispanic or Latino of any race. 29.3% were of American, 22.2% German, 12.1% English and 10.9% Irish ancestry according to 2000 census.

In 2005 94.7% of the county's population was non-Hispanic whites. Latinos were 1.3% of the population.

There were 15,416 households, out of which 34.70% had children under the age of 18 living with them, 57.40% were married couples living together, 10.10% had a female householder with no husband present, and 28.20% were non-families. 23.70% of all households were made up of individuals, and 9.90% had someone living alone who was 65 years of age or older. The average household size was 2.56 and the average family size was 3.03.

In the county, the population was spread out, with 26.40% under the age of 18, 10.20% from 18 to 24, 29.10% from 25 to 44, 22.10% from 45 to 64, and 12.20% who were 65 years of age or older. The median age was 35 years. For every 100 females there were 96.10 males. For every 100 females age 18 and over, there were 92.70 males.

The median income for a household in the county was $40,467, and the median income for a family was $48,158. Males had a median income of $34,448 versus $23,846 for females. The per capita income for the county was $18,462. About 6.40% of families and 8.60% of the population were below the poverty line, including 9.90% of those under age 18 and 11.60% of those age 65 or over.

Politics
Clinton County is a strongly Republican county. Since 1856 the only Democrat to win a majority in the county has been Lyndon Johnson in 1964, and he did so by only 432 votes.

|}

Government

The Clinton County Courthouse was built in 1915 in Wilmington. The courthouse is located at 53 E. Main Street.

The Wilmington Public Library of Clinton County serves the communities of Clinton County from its administrative offices and main library in Wilmington and its Clinton-Massie branch in Clarksville. In 2005, the library loaned more than 161,000 items to its 17,000 cardholders. Total holdings as of 2005 were over 64,000 volumes with over 90 periodical subscriptions.

Education
The following school districts have territory in Clinton County. Those primarily in Clinton are in bold, those primarily in other counties are in italics. The county a district is primarily located in is bolded.
Blanchester Local School District (also in Brown, Clermont, and Warren)
Clinton-Massie Local School District (also in Warren)
East Clinton Local School District (also in Fayette, Greene, and Highland)
Fairfield Local School District (also in Highland)
Fayetteville-Perry Local School District (also in Brown)
Greeneview Local School District (also in Greene)
Lynchburg-Clay Local School District (also in Highland)
Miami Trace Local School District (also in Fayette)
Wilmington City School District (also in Greene)
Xenia Community School District (also in Greene and Warren)

Recreation
Clinton County is home to Cowan Lake State Park, where outdoor recreationalists enjoy fishing, swimming, boating, hiking, bicycling, camping, and wildlife viewing. The northwestern border of Clinton County is formed by Caesar Creek Lake, which is part of Caesar Creek State Park. Fossil hunting is popular here, in addition to similar activities enjoyed at Cowan Lake.
Wilmington College in Wilmington has several NCAA Division III athletic programs, whose events can be attended by the public. The city is also the home of the Clinton County Corn Festival.

Clinton County is firmly within the Cincinnati market for professional sports. Many residents are supporters of the Cincinnati Reds and the Cincinnati Bengals. Cincinnati is a one-hour or less drive away for nearly all Clinton County residents.

Transportation
Interstate 71 crosses the northern third of the county, trending northeast to southwest and connecting Clinton County to Columbus, Ohio and Cincinnati. Clinton County is part of the Cincinnati-Middletown-Wilmington Combined Statistical Area, although there is little true urban activity in the county. U.S. Route 68 is the major north–south route through the county, while U.S. Route 22 runs east–west. Several other state and local highways serve the residents of Clinton County. Clinton Field is a public use airport located four nautical miles (7 km) northwest of the central business district of Wilmington.

Communities

City
Wilmington (county seat)

Villages

Blanchester
Clarksville
Lynchburg
Martinsville
Midland
Port William
Sabina

Townships

Adams
Chester
Clark
Green
Jefferson
Liberty
Marion
Richland
Union
Vernon
Washington
Wayne
Wilson

Unincorporated communities

Bloomington
Burtonville
Cuba
Farmers
Gurneyville
Jonesboro
Lees Creek
Lumberton
McKays Station
Melvin
Memphis
Morrisville
New Antioch
North Kingman
Oakland
Ogden
Reesville
Sligo
Westboro

Ghost town
New Burlington

See also
National Register of Historic Places listings in Clinton County, Ohio

References

External links

 
Clinton County Convention & Visitors Bureau
Clinton County History Center
Wilmington Public Library
Ohio Township websites

 
1810 establishments in Ohio
Populated places established in 1810